Defence Committee may refer to:

 Defence Committee (Australia)
Canadian House of Commons Standing Committee on National Defence
Canadian Senate Standing Committee on National Security and Defence
National Defence and Armed Forces Committee (French assembly)
Standing Committee on Defence (India)
Joint Committee on Foreign Affairs and Defence of the Oireachtas of Ireland
 Committee on Defence (Sweden)
 Defence Committee of the Cabinet (Pakistan)
 Defence Select Committee of the British House of Commons
International Relations and Defence Committee of the British House of Lords